A forecast region is a unique geographical area for which individual weather reports are issued.

Canada
In Canada, the Meteorological Service divides the country into several forecast regions for the purpose of issuing routine text forecasts and weather warnings, as Canada's provinces and territories do not use a common second-level administrative division scheme similar to the division of states into counties and parishes in the United States.  Due to the localized nature of some weather phenomena, such as freezing rain storms and tornadoes, some forecast regions that have been found to be more prone to such phenomena are further divided into sub-regions, especially in the Prairie provinces.  Parts of Northern British Columbia, Northern Quebec, Labrador, and the territories do not belong to any forecast region, owing to the lack of any significant population in those areas.

With the implementation of Specific Area Message Encoding into the Weatheradio Canada service in 2007, each forecast region and sub-region has been given a unique six-digit code known as a Canadian Location Code, or CLC.  These codes are programmed into SAME-capable weather radio receivers the same way FIPS county codes are programmed into receivers in the United States, enabling them to only activate and sound an alert when the MSC issues weather warnings for the forecast regions that have their codes programmed into the receivers.  Outside of Nunavut and the Northwest Territories, CLCs are assigned using the format 0paabb, where 0 is a constant, p is a province or provincial or territorial grouping, aa refers to a specific forecast region, and bb, if nonzero, refers to a sub-region.  In Nunavut and the Northwest Territories, where population densities are much lower than elsewhere in the country, the format is 09aaa0, where aaa refers to the forecast region.  On the water, CLCs are assigned using the format 00aaab, where aaa refers to the forecast region, and b, if nonzero, refers to a sub-region.  CLCs are also assigned to the areas of international waters for which Canada issues maritime navigation and weather warnings.

List of forecast regions by province and territory
If viewing this page online, each forecast region name is linked to a page on the MSC's website detailing all watches and warnings currently in effect for that region.

List of marine forecast regions
If viewing this page online, each marine forecast region entry is linked to a page on the MSC's website with the marine forecast and any warnings in effect for that region.

United States
In the U.S., the National Weather Service uses zone forecasts, where generally each county is a zone.  For counties near the ocean, there are normally two zones: coastal and inland.  The same is true for counties that are part mountainous and part lowland, or for counties that are quite long.  This older system is not used for warnings, which are based on FIPS codes (two digits for the state, three for the county or independent city), with the initial digit being for optional sub-county divisions.  Both of these are becoming less important with the advent of point forecasts, and polygonal warning boxes based on lines drawn between geographic coordinate points.  The coordinates of such points are listed at the end of each warning.

The term county warning area is also used to indicate the area of responsibility for each NWS forecast office.  The forecast area is usually synonymous with the broadcast range of all NOAA Weather Radio stations programmed from any particular office, though the broadcast callsign followed by "listening area" is often used.

References

Weather forecasting